Basílica José de Anchieta is a church located in São Paulo, Brazil. It was built in 1554–56.

See also
 List of Jesuit sites

References

Roman Catholic churches in São Paulo